Ted Peers may refer to:

 Teddy Peers (1886–1935), Wales international football goalkeeper
 Ted Peers (footballer) (1873–1905), English footballer